Xinjiang Sport Lottery Football Club (Simplified Chinese: 新疆体彩足球俱乐部) is a football (soccer) club based in Xinjiang, China.

Managers
As of 2009:

Team results

External links
Sina.com 2007season Yi league
Xinjiang Football Blog
Baidu Xinjiang Football Forum
Tianshannet Xinjiang Sport Lottery Special

Defunct football clubs in China
Football clubs in China
Sport in Xinjiang
2006 establishments in China